Damba Airport  is a public use airport serving the town of Damba, in the Uíge Province of Angola.

See also

 List of airports in Angola
 Transport in Angola

References

External links 
OpenStreetMap - Damba
OurAirports - Damba

Airports in Angola